A list of films produced in Russia in 2023 (see 2023 in film).

Film releases

Cultural Russian films
 The Palace is a 2023 drama film directed by Roman Polanski.
 Tetris is a 2023 biographical film directed by Jon S. Baird.

No dates 
 The Warrior Princess by Alexey Zamyslov and Vladimir Nikolaev.
 The White List, crime film by Alisa Khazanova.
 1984, science-fiction film by Diana Ringo.

See also 
 2023 in film

References

2023
Films
Lists of 2023 films by country or language